This is Dom Joly is a spoof chat show presented by Dom Joly, originally shown on BBC Three in 2003. It featured interviews, live bands (complete with animals dancing around the band), "video diary" sketches, and the chance for a guest to describe an activity "in a nutshell".

It followed the global success of Trigger Happy TV for Channel 4 with Joly's move to the BBC. However, it did not meet the success of his previous project.

External links
 

BBC television comedy
BBC television talk shows
2000s British comedy television series
2003 British television series debuts
2003 British television series endings